The royal motto of the Swedish monarch is a Swedish royal tradition stemming from the early 16th century. All reigning monarchs of Sweden, beginning with Gustav I, have had their own mottos during their respective periods of reign. The Swedish royal motto in many ways is equivalent to a national motto. The tradition among Swedish monarchs, in common with the Danish and Norwegian monarchies, but different from that of most other modern European monarchies, is that the motto is not the same for one dynasty, but is personal to each monarch. Historically the royal motto has been used in connection with the Swedish coat of arms, and until 30 June 2017 it could be seen in print on the 1 krona coin. The new generation of coins does not feature a motto.

Gustav III was the first king to have his motto only in Swedish. Up until Adolf Frederick, the motto for every regent had been in Latin and Swedish (or, as in the case of Gustav II Adolf, in German). Due to the dissolution of the union between Norway and Sweden in 1905, Oscar II had to change his motto.

See also
 List of Swedish monarchs
 Royal mottos of Danish monarchs
 Royal mottos of Norwegian monarchs

References

External links
Mottoes of The Kings and Queens of Sweden

Swedish monarchy
Swedish monarchs